Poppy Elizabeth Jamie (born 19 July 1990) is a British entrepreneur and former television presenter based in London. She is a co-founder of the accessories brand Pop & Suki and the wellbeing and mindfulness app Happy Not perfect.

Entrepreneurship

In September 2016, Jamie launched accessories brand Pop & Suki, co-founded with Suki Waterhouse. Pop & Suki's launch collection includes handbags and jewellery, and has been featured in publications including Vogue, Harper's Bazaar, W, and Elle.

Jamie also launched Happy Not Perfect in 2017, an app focused on improving mental health and positive wellbeing. The aim of the app is stated to be "to raise self-esteem and try to counteract the culture of likes and selfies through feel-good mantras, brain games and community."

In September 2016, it was announced that Jamie would be a speaker at the TEDxHollywood 2016 conference.

Entertainment career

Since 2010 she has anchored a variety of shows including FYI Daily and The Hot Desk, both for ITV2, and the MTV Movie Awards on MTV International. 

At the age of 19, Jamie became an entertainment correspondent at ITN. In 2012 she graduated from the London School of Economics and was hired as a correspondent for Extra.

In 2015, Jamie hosted Pillow Talk with Poppy, Snapchat's first chat show.

References

External links
Poppy Jamie on TED, 2014
Poppy Jamie, the Golden Girl of Showbiz 26 January 2015 by Monicha Tully
'Fast & Furious 6': Poppy Jamie Huffington Post, September 2013
A Brit In California, Poppy Jamie's Guide To L.A. Suitcase Magazine, September 2014

ITN newsreaders and journalists
Living people
British television presenters
English television presenters
1990 births